The Brothers may refer to:

Geography
 The Brothers (islands), Hong Kong, East and West, in the mouth of the Pearl River
 The Brothers (islands), New Zealand in Cook Strait
 The Brothers (Olympic Mountains), a mountain in the United States
 The Brothers (San Francisco Bay), two islands, East and West, in California
 The Brothers (Andaman and Nicobar Islands), India
 The Brothers, the collective name for the islands of Darsah and Samhah

Arts, entertainment, and media

Films
 The Brothers (1947 film), a British melodrama
 The Brothers (1973 film), aka The Kung Fu Brothers, a Hong Kong film directed by Chan Tung-Man
 The Brothers (1979 film), a Hong Kong film produced by Shaw Brothers Studios
 The Brothers (2001 film), an American romantic comedy
 The Brothers (2006 film), an Irish television documentary short nominated for a 2007 Irish Film and Television Award

Literature
 The Brothers (Shirley play), a 1653 play by James Shirley
 The Brothers (Young play), a 1728 play by Edward Young
 The Brothers (Cumberland play), a 1769 play by Richard Cumberland
 The Brothers (novella), a novella by C. J. Cherryh
 "The Brothers" (short story), a 1937 short story by John Cheever
 The Brothers, a 2006 play by Angie Le Mar
 The Brothers, a novel by Leonard Strong, basis for the 1947 film
 The Brothers, a novella by H. G. Wells
 Adelphoe (The Brothers), a 160 BC play by Terence
 The Brothers (Kinzer book), a 2013 book by Stephen Kinzer

Music

Groups and labels
 The Brothers (band), a 1970s UK musical group
 The Brothers (disco group), a 1970s group produced by Warren Schatz
 Family Force 5, formerly The Brothers, an American Christian crunkcore band

Albums
The Brothers (album) an album by Stan Getz and Zoot Sims 
The Brothers!, a 1956 album by Al Cohn, Bill Perkins and Ritchie Kamuca 
 The Brothers: Isley, an album by The Isley Brothers

Songs
 "The Brothers", by Momus from his 2016 album Scobberlotchers

Radio
 The Brothers (radio show), a UK radio programme

Television
 The Brothers (1956 TV series), an American sitcom about the owners of a photography studio 
 The Brothers (1972 TV series), a British drama about a road haulage company 
 The Brothers (1980 TV series), a Hong Kong TV series
 The Brothers, a UK comedy starring Jason Barrett
 Tawan Tud Burapha (The Brothers), a 2015 Thai TV series

Other uses
 The Brothers (ship), a schooner wrecked near Tasmania in 1816
 The Brothers (ferry), a 19th-century Manly-to-Sydney ferry in Australia
 The Brothers, a football club in Hoofdklasse (Suriname)

See also
 The Bruthers (garage rock band), a 1960s American group
 
 Brothers (disambiguation)
 Band of Brothers (disambiguation)
 Brother (disambiguation)
 Brotherhood (disambiguation)